Opium and the Kung-Fu Master is a 1984 Hong Kong martial arts film directed by Tang Chia, who also serves as one of the film's action directors, and stars Ti Lung as the titular protagonist.

Plot
Master Tit-kiu Sam (Ti Lung), the leader of the Ten Tigers of Canton, is the chief coach of China's militia. At that time, the opium ban was in use, but public sale of opium was widely available. Many bureaucrats were taking opium, a trend that Tit followed. As Tit takes opium, his physical skills were declining. Seeing how Tit's skills are declining, opium store owner Wing Fung (Chen Kuan-tai) challenges Tit to a public duel. Tit struggles to fight Wing and was in serious danger until his disciple Lo Kwa-sei (Robert Mak) steps in to rescue him before dying from his injuries. Seeing his disciple killed by Wing, Tit vows to seek revenge.

Cast
Ti Lung as Tit-kiu-sam
Robert Mak as Lo Kwa-sei
Leanne Liu as Siu-chui
Chen Kuan-tai as Wing Fung
Philip Ko as Golden Cat
Koo Koon-chung as Mok Tim
Alan Chan as Tai-kau
Lee Hoi-sang as Instructor Cheng Wang
Yue Tau-wan as Wong On
Tang Chia as Master Yee-sing
Chan Shen as Mr. Lo
Kwan Fung as Fire Unicorn
Ho Wai-han as Fat Girl
Lui Hui as Sau's mother
Chan Yuet-yue as Lan
Cheung Kwok-wa as Cat's hired rascal
Elvis Tsui as Cat's hired rascal
Kong Chuen as Kwa-sei's worker
Stephen Chan as Kwa-sei's worker
Ailen Sit as Kwa-sei's worker
Wong Wai-tong as Kwa-sei's worker
Jacky Yeung as Kwa-sei's worker
Ho Wing-cheung as Kwa-sei's worker
Fei Kin as Kwa-sei's worker
Lee Yiu-king as Kwa-sei's worker
Wong Chi-ming as Cheng Wang's man
Yuen Bun as Cheng Wang's man
Ma Hon-yuen as Cheng Wang's man
Wong Chi-keung as Cheng Wang's man
Lee Hang as Cheng Wang's man
Yuen Wah as Cheng Wang's man
Ng Yuen-fan as Cheng Wang's man
Wong Pau-kei as Cheng Wang's man
Ling Chi-hung as Cheng Wang's man
Lung Ying as Cheng Wang's man
Ngai Tim-choi as Cheng Wang's man
Kong Long as Mr. Lo's servant
Ting Tung as Villager
Cheung Sek-au as Villager
Wong Ching-ho as Villager
Wang Han-chen as Villager
Cheung Chok-chow as Villager
Yeung Chi-hing as Villager
Ling Hon as Villager
Fong Yue as Villager
Cheng Miu as Villager
Fung Ming as Villager
Shum Lo as Villager
Ho Pak-kwong as Villager
Gam Tin-chue as Villager
Sai Gwa-pau as Villager
Wong Kung-miu as Villager
Wong Wa as Boatman
Chan Hung as Master Mo's servant
Lam Wai
Wong Chue-Kwong
Chan Shiu-wa as Wing Fung's thug

Critical reception
Adam Tyner of DVD Talk rated the film 4 stars out of 5 and writes "Opium and the Kung-Fu Master is outstanding, bolstered by an onslaught of startling action sequences and a remarkably effective undercurrent of addiction". Sylvia Rorem of Hong Kong Cinemagic gave the film a positive review and writes: "Opium and the Kung Fu Master is not simply a light piece of chop socky entertainment. While it is not a life-changing film, it is a solid, quality kung fu drama that can stand up to repeated viewings".

References

External links

Opium and the Kung-Fu Master at Hong Kong Cinemagic

1984 films
1980s action thriller films
1984 martial arts films
Hong Kong action thriller films
Hong Kong martial arts films
Kung fu films
Wushu films
1980s Cantonese-language films
Shaw Brothers Studio films
Films set in Guangdong
Films shot in Hong Kong
Films about opium
1980s Hong Kong films